The Haunted Sea is a 1997 American horror film directed by Dan Golden. It was part of the Roger Corman Presents series.

Plot

Near the Yucatan Peninsula, a ship, the "Hades", is found drifting in the ocean without a crew. Captain Ramsey and his crew discover the ship's cargo contains ancient Aztec treasure from Montezuma's temple.

Crewmen Delgago and Lane try to steal the treasure. Delgago is possessed by a statue, and transforms into a reptile monster that kills Lane. The monster sets about killing the rest of the crew.

Second mate Medina discovers the Hades' captain, Jameson, is still alive and was possessed. Jameson kills himself.

The only survivors left are Medina and first mate Bergren . They rig the Hades with explosives. The monster kills Bergren, and Medina jumps overboard just as the Hades is blown apart. She's rescued by the cargo ship, but is now possessed herself.

Cast
Krista Allen as 2nd Mate Johnson
Don Stroud as Chief Foster
Duane Whitaker as Andy Delgado
Jeff Phillips as Charlie Lane
James Brolin as Captain Ramsey
Joanna Pacula as 1st Mate Bergren
Ronald William Lawrence as Marcus Talbot
Eb Lottimer as Doug Ward
Leonard Donato as Chief Engineer Anderson

Release
The Haunted Sea was released on VHS by New Horizons Home Video on November 17, 1997. It was later released on DVD by Cav Distributing Corporation on September 21, 2004.

Reception

TV Guide awarded the film 1/5 stars, criticizing the film for its dialogue, direction, overuse of stock footage, and lack of scares and imagination. Charles Tatum from eFilmCritic awarded the film a negative 1/5 stars, criticizing the film's bland direction, unconvincing monster costume, and script. Andrew Pragasam from The Spinning Image awarded the film 6/10 stars, writing, " Though far from groundbreaking and with the low budget showing through on occasion, The Haunted Sea is still a tight, compelling little exploitation picture. The creature suit looks a little rubbery but the transformation effects and gore are more accomplished than one might expect."

References

External links
 
 
 
 

1996 films
1996 horror films
1990s monster movies
American monster movies
American supernatural horror films
1990s supernatural horror films
Films based on mythology
Films produced by Roger Corman
Films set in Mexico
1990s English-language films
Films directed by Dan Golden
1990s American films